The 2016 BYU Cougars football team represented Brigham Young University in the 2016 NCAA Division I FBS football season. The Cougars, led by first-year head coach Kalani Sitake, played their home games at LaVell Edwards Stadium. This was the sixth year BYU competes as an NCAA Division I FBS independent. They finished the season 9–4. They were invited to the Poinsettia Bowl where they defeated Wyoming.

Before the season

Coaching changes
BYU hired a new coaching staff in 2016. Gone from the program were Bronco Mendenhall, who accepted the Head coach position with the Virginia Cavaliers on December 4, and assistant coaches Robert Anae, Garett Tujague, Mark Atuaia, Jason Beck, Nick Howell, and Kelly Poppinga, who accepted positions on Virginia's new coaching staff.

On December 19, 2015, Kalani Sitake was announced as the new head coach. Sitake is the first Tongan to become a FBS collegiate football head coach.

On December 24, 2015, Ilaisa Tuiaki was appointed the defensive coordinator and Ty Detmer the offensive coordinator.

On December 26, 2015, Ed Lamb was appointed the assistant head coach.

In December 2015, Nu'u Tafisi was reported as being named as the strength and conditioning coach. On January 14, 2015 Tafisi was confirmed as a new member of the staff. Steve Kaufusi was also announced as a returning member of the staff, and former BYU offensive line coach Mike Empey, who served as offensive line coach under the legendary LaVell Edwards, was announced as a new staff member.

On January 20, 2016 Ben Cahoon was hired as the wide receivers coach.

On January 25, 2016 Steve Clark was hired as the tight end coach, Russell Tialavea was hired as the director of football operations, and AJ Middleton was hired as the asst. strength and conditioning coach.

On January 28, 2016, the final members of the coaching staff were hired. Reno Mahe was hired as the running backs coach, Jernaro Gilford was hired as the cornerbacks coach, and Tevita Ofahengaue was hired as the director of recruiting operations.

2016 recruits

2016 returning missionaries

2016 departures

Media

Football Media Day
Football Media Day took place on June 30, 2016. It aired live on BYUtv, with a simulcast on ESPN3. On it Coach Sitake talked about future scheduling, Tom Holmoe discussed BYU's interest in the Big XII Conference, Coach Detmer talked about the switch to the Pro-style offense and how it will rely more on tight ends, and Coach Tuikai talked about the defensive scheme switching from 3–4 to 4–3. Throughout the day multiple players were also interviewed by Spencer Linton, Jarom Jordan, Lauren Francom, Jason Shepherd, Greg Wrubell, and various media members that covered BYU. Topics discussed during the interview included off-season workouts, marital status changes, the coaching changes, the QB controversy (Taysom Hill declared he could play that day if he was needed to), and many other topics. The day ended with a look back at the 1996 team that went 14–1 and won the Cotton Bowl.

During Media Day it was also revealed that Nike is working on a new shoe for Taysom Hill that gives additional support through the arch. It will also include the orthotics as an insole on top of that.

Cougar IMG Sports Network Affiliates

KSL 102.7 FM and 1160 AM- Flagship Station (Salt Lake City/ Provo, UT, iHeartRadio and ksl.com)
BYU Radio- Nationwide (Dish Network 980, Sirius XM 143, TuneIn radio, and byuradio.org)
KIDO- Boise, ID (football only)
KTHK- Blackfoot/ Idaho Falls/ Pocatello/ Rexburg, ID
KMGR- Manti, UTKSUB- Cedar City, UT
KDXU- St. George, UT
KSHP- Las Vegas, NV (football only)

Roster

Schedule
The 2016 schedule was believed to be BYU's hardest schedule to date. It featured Power 5 teams from the Pac-12, Big Ten, Big 12, and SEC along with teams that have normally been ranked from the Group of 5 schools. However, at the end of the 2016 season it appeared noticeably weaker than previously predicted, with Sagarin ranking the schedule 75th.

Game summaries

Arizona

Sources:

Uniform combination: white helmet, white jersey, white pants.

The Cougar offense and defense dominated for three quarters of the game, but it took a 33-yard field goal from freshman kicker Jake Oldroyd for BYU to prevail 18–16 and give Kalani Sitake his first win as Cougar head coach.

Oldroyd originally wasn't scheduled to be on the road roster. A late Thursday move moved Oldroyd past James Baird on the depth chart and onto the roster. After sophomore kicker Rhett Almond missed the extra point, BYU decided to make the move to Oldroyd showing the kicking battle still hasn't been settled for the Cougars this season.

In his return to the Cougars Jamaal Williams had a fine game, rushing for 162 yards on 29 carries, an average of 5.2 yards per carry, and winning BYUtv's Y-Factor award. Williams would also catch one pass for 10 yards. It was Taysom Hill though who carried much of the team.

Hill threw for 202 yards, a touchdown, and no interceptions. After BYU fell behind 16–15, Hill took possession of the ball at the 20. He scrambled twice for a first down and went 3-for-3 passing on the series. Overall Hill would carry the ball for 37 yards and four first downs.

A late illegal procedure penalty with :08 seconds left nearly cost the Cougars, but BYU chose to use their final timeout and avoid the 10-second runoff. The ball had been moved from BYU's 20 to Arizona's 16, but the loss of the timeout forced Oldroyd to kick from the left hash instead of dead center. After a failed freeze by Rich Rodriguez, Oldroyd nailed the kick right down the center to give BYU the lead back and ultimately the win.

Game Stats: 
Passing: BYU: Taysom Hill 21–29–0—202; Arizona: Anu Solomon 20–30–2—213.
Rushing: BYU: Jamaal Williams 29–162, Hill 11–37, Algernon Brown 3–7, Squally Canada 2–6, Brayden Al-Bakri 1–1; Arizona: Nick Wilson 17–138, Orlando Bradford 1–1, J.J. Taylor 1-(−4), Solomon 7-(−20).
Receiving: BYU: Jonah Trinnaman 6–49, Moroni Laulu-Pututau 4–49, Colby Pearson 4–37, Hunter Marshall 2–29, Brown 1–14, Williams 1–10, Nick Kurtz 1–9, Tanner Balderdee 2–5; Arizona: Nate Phillips 7–69, Trey Griffey 4–66, Tyrell Johnson 2–28, Shawn Poindexter 1–19, Samajie Grant 3–14, Wilson 2–11, Josh Kern 1–6.
Interceptions: BYU: Kai Nacua 1–1, Francis Bernard 1–0.

Utah

Sources:

Uniform combination: white helmet with royal blue decals and royal blue chromium facemasks, royal blue jersey, white pants
Turnovers plagued both teams. A pick six on the first play of the game put BYU behind the eight ball and made many people fear it would be the Las Vegas Bowl all over again. BYU rebounded from the pick six though, forcing 6 turnovers (3 interceptions, 2 fumbles, and a muffed punt). The turnovers led directly to 13 of BYU's points.

However a hard hit caused Jamaal Williams to sit most of the fourth quarter, and two questionable targeting calls ejected two of BYU's top defenders, one of which was captain Kai Nacua (the referee couldn't initially get his number right, first saying 32 and 13 before finally correctly saying 12) who had intercepted two passes to that point; Austin McChesney was ejected for targeting as Francis Bernard (the actual number 13) came down with the third pick.

Even with all the questionable calls and forced turnovers, both BYU and Utah found they had ample opportunities to score that they didn't capitalize on. A failed two-point conversion attempt was followed by a failed onside kick attempt and ultimately cost BYU the game.

One game after limiting his rushing, Taysom Hill rushed was 87 yards and 2 touchdowns showing he's as big a threat rushing as ever. BYU now prepares for their home opener against UCLA with a +5 turnover margin. Whether the offense can some of the turnovers into touchdowns though is anyone's guess.

Game Stats: 
Passing: BYU: Taysom Hill 21–39–3—176, Mitch Juergens 1–1–0—9, Team 0–1–0—0; Utah: Troy Williams 14–23–3—194.
Rushing: BYU: Hill 13–87, Jamaal Williams 12–58, Brayden El-Bakri 1–1, Algernon Brown 1-(−3); Utah: Troy McCormick 10–62, Zack Moss 12–58, Joe Williams 10–26, Troy Williams 7–13, Kyle Fulks 2–11, Team 1-(−1).
Receiving: BYU: Juergens 8–52, Nick Kurtz 3–35, Moroni Laulu-Pututau 3–31, Jonah Trinnaman 2–27, Colby Pearson 2–10, Williams 1–10, Corbin Kaufusi 1–9, Aleva Hifo 1–7, Ului Lapuaho 1–4; Utah: Tyrone Smith 2–60, Tim Patrick 3–59, Rae Singleton 2–23, Evan Moeai 2–21, Harris Handley 2–21, Demari Simpkins 2–6, Joe Williams 1–4.
Interceptions: BYU: Kai Nacua 2–0, Francis Bernard 1–0; Utah: Sunia Tauteoli 2–41, Reginald Porter 1–1.

UCLA

Sources:

Uniform combination: White helmet, blue jersey, white pants

Game Stats: 
Passing: UCLA: Josh Rosen 26–40–1—307; BYU: Taysom Hill 26–48–1—250
Rushing: UCLA: Nate Starks 15–39, Bolu Olorunfunmi 8–15, Brandon Stephens 5–4, Ishmael Adams 1–1, Jalen Starks 2–1, Team 2-(−2), Rosen 1-(−8); BYU: Jamaal Williams 14–28, Squally Canada 1–2, Hill 10-(−7).
Receiving: UCLA: Darren Andrews 4–91, Nate Iese 2–34, Adams 2–27, Mossi Johnson 2–26, Kenneth Walker III 2–25, Jordan Lasley 4–21, Cameron Griffin 2–18, Nate Starks 3–16, Alex Van Dyke 1–7, Caleb Wilson 1–5, Austin Roberts 1–5; BYU: Nick Kurtz 8–83, Moroni Laulu-Pututau 6–51, Williams 2–45, Colby Pearson 3–27, Hunter Marshall 1–16, Jonah Trinnaman 3–12, Mitch Juergens 1–10, Garrett Juergens 1–6, Aleva Hifo 1–0.
Interceptions: UCLA: Adarius Pickett 1–0; BYU: Fred Warner 1–0.

West Virginia

Sources:

Uniform combination: white helmet, white jersey, blue pants.

Game Stats: 
Passing: BYU: Taysom Hill 23–35–3—241, Team 0–1–0—0; WVU: Skyler Howard 31–40–1—332.
Rushing: BYU: Jamaal Williams 24–169, Hill 13–101, Squally Canada 2–6, Micah Hanneman 1–4; WVU: Justin Crawford 9–86, Rushel Shell 11–35, Howard 11–27, Kennedy McKoy 1–5, Tyler Orlosky 1-(−2), Team 2-(−2).
Receiving: BYU: Nick Kurtz 6–78, Colby Pearson 4–55, Mitch Juergens 5–50, Aleva Hifo 4–26, Morono Laulu-Pututau 2–21, Williams 2–11; WVU: Shelton Gibson 4–144, Ka'Raun White 4–39, Crawford 3–36, Jovon Durante 6–32, Daikiel Shorts 5–22, Shell 4–22, Devonte Mathis 1–13, Kennedy McCoy 2–11, Gary Jennings 1–9, Elijah Wellman 1–4.
Interceptions: BYU: Butch Pau'u 1–20; WVU: Rasul Douglas 1–54, Maurice Fleming 1–2, Jeremy Tyler 1–0.

Toledo

Sources:

Uniform combination: white helmet, white jersey, white pants.

Game Stats: 
Passing: TOL: Logan Woodside 30–38–2—505; BYU: Taysom Hill 11–21–0—248.
Rushing: TOL: Kareem Hunt 27–146, Terry Swanson 10–45, Damion Jones-Moore 1–1, Woodside 3-(−5); BYU: Jamaal Williams 30–286, Squally Canada 9–49, Hill 6–3.
Receiving: TOL: Jon'Vea Johnson 9–182, Cody Thompson 5–161, Corey Jones 6–56, Hunt 4–49, Michael Roberts 4–36, Swanson 1–11, Darryl Richards 1–10; BYU: Jonah Trinnaman 1–75, Tanner Balderree 3–62, Colby Pearson 2–41, Algernon Brown 2–37, Brayden El-Bakri 1–19, Aleva Hifo 2–14.
Interceptions: BYU: Dayan Lake 1–49, Kai Nacua 1–20.

Michigan State

Sources:

Uniform combination: white helmet, white jersey, blue pants.

Game Stats: 
Passing: BYU: Taysom Hill 18–27–0—138; MSU: Damion Terry 6–10–1—63, Tyler O'Connor 7–11–0—58.
Rushing: BYU: Jamaal Williams 30–163, Squally Canada 6–50, Hill 8–47, Colby Pearson 1–3, Algernon Brown 2–1, Team 2-(−4); MSU: Gerald Holmes 15–57, Terry 8–29, LJ Scott 3–9, Madre London 1–4, RJ Shelton 1–2, O'Connor 3-(−7), Team 1-(−9).
Receiving: BYU: Jonah Trinnaman 6–55, Nick Kurtz 3–27, Mitch Juergens 2–24, Pearson 3–15, Hunter Marshall 1–6, Brown 1–5, Williams 1–4, Quin Ficklin 1–2; MSU: Josiah Price 2–29, Felton Davis 1–28, Holmes 4–22, RJ Shelton 3–18, Donnie Corley 2–13, Jamal Lyles 1–11.
Interceptions: BYU: Michael Davis 1–40.

Mississippi State

Sources:

Uniform combination: white helmet with royal blue decals and royal blue chromium facemasks, royal blue jersey, white pants.

Game Stats: 
Passing: MSU: Nick Fitzgerald 17–36–2—214, Fred Ross 1–1–0—9; BYU: Taysom Hill 16–28–1—165.
Rushing: MSU: Aeris Williams 21–82, Nick Fitzgerald 16–41, Malik Dear 3–17, Keith Mixon 3–13, Ashton Shumpert 6–10; BYU: Jamaal Williams 26–76, Hill 17–53, Squally Canada 3–11, Tanner Balderdee 0–7, Team 1-(−1).
Receiving: MSU: Fred Ross 5–69, Keith Mixon 4–69, Dear 3–36, Donald Gray 2–17, Ashton Shumpert 1–17, Fitzgerald 1–9, Jordan Thomas 1–6, Dontavian Lee 1–0; BYU: Nick Kurtz 7–62, Colby Pearson 4–36, Moroni Laulu-Pututau 2–34, Tanner Balderdee 1–25, Jonah Trinnaman 1–7, Hunter Marshall 1–1.
Interceptions: MSU: Mark McLaurin 1–27; BYU: Kai Nacua 1–10, Micah Hannemann 1–0.

Boise State

BYU learned during pregame festivities that Jamaal Williams suffered a knee injury against Mississippi State and would be unable to play. Squally Canada filled in for him rushing for 88 yards, a career-high, but Boise State's defense was able to force BYU to become one-dimensional and focus on passing the ball. Hill would complete only 50% and have a season low in terms of passing yards. Of the 21 incompletions, 12 different balls were dropped by the receivers. BYU's defense kept the Cougars in the game, forcing Boise State to a season high 5 turnovers (3 fumbles, 2 interceptions), a missed field goal, a blocked field goal, and a muffed punt. However, the Cougars found themselves unable to contain Jeremy McNichols, who went for a season high 249 all purpose yards and two touchdowns. BYU has now suffered four losses by a combined 8 points, making them the most dangerous four loss team in the country. Of BYU's four losses, 3 of them are now ranked in the Top 25 after week 8 (Boise State, West Virginia, and Utah).

Sources:

Uniform combination: white helmet, white jersey, blue pants.

Game Stats: 
Passing: BYU: Taysom Hill 21–42–0—187; BSU: Brett Rypien 25–39–2—442.
Rushing: BYU: Squally Canada 21–88, Hill 13–48, Algernon Brown 2–8, Jonny Linehan 1-(−3), Aleva Hifo 1-(−6); BSU: Jeremy McNichols 30–140, Alex Mattison 1–4, Rypien 4(−15).
Receiving: BYU: Mitch Juergens 4–57, Tanner Balderree 2–33, Colby Pearson 4–31, Jonah Trinnaman 3–24, Nick Kurtz 2–16, Moroni Laulu-Pututau 2–14, Cana 3–7, Beau Tanner 1–5; BSU: Thomas Sperback 9–109, McNichols 5–109, Sean Modster 4–82, Cedrick Wilson 4–68, Jake Knight 1–46, Mattison 1–15, Chaz Anderson 1–13. 
Interceptions: BYU: Fred Warner 1–59, Dayan Lake 1–50.

Cincinnati

Sources:

Uniform combination: white helmet, white jersey, blue pants.

Game Stats: 
Passing: BYU: Taysom Hill 15–25–1—130; CIN: Gunner Kiel 19–32–1—199.
Rushing: BYU: Jamaal Williams 25–96, Hill 12–75, Squally Canada 9–41, Team 1-(−1); CIN: Tion Green 16–86, Mike Boone 2–22, Kahlil Lewis 2–5, Chad Banschbach 2–4, Team 1-(−1), Kiel 2-(−16).
Receiving: BYU: Jonah Trinnaman 2–47, Nick Kurtz 4–33, Mitch Juergens 4–24, Colby Pearson 2–16, Algernon Brown 2–11, Aleva Hifo 1-(−1); CIN: Devin Gray 7–105, Tion Green 5–22, Lewis 1–16, Nate Cole 1–15, Thomas Geddis 1–14, Mike Boone 1–11, Tshumbi Johnson 1–9, Banschbach 2–7.
Interceptions: BYU: Austin McChesney 1–37; CIN: Zach Edwards 1–6.

Southern Utah

Sources:

Uniform combination: white helmet, blue jersey, white pants.

Game Stats: 
Passing: SUU: Patrick Tyler 19–32–0—144, Raysean Pringle 0–1–0—0; BYU: Taysom Hill 22–29–1—320, Tanner Mangum 11–13–0—121.
Rushing: SUU: Malik Brown 8–25, Pringle 3–15, Tyler 7-(−19); BYU: KJ Hall 12–59, Mangum 4–42, Hill 7–29, Algernon Brown 7–28, Colby Hansen 3–8, Sqally Canada 6–5, Team 1-(−16).
Receiving: SUU: Pringle 3–63, Steven Wroblews 3–30, Logan Parker 3–26, Mike Sharp 5–15, Brown 2–13, Ty Rutledge 1–1, Isaiah Diego-Wi 1-(−2), James Felila 1-(−2); BYU: Mitch Juergens 6–82, Nick Kurtz 5–69, Brayden El_Bakri 4–69, Hall 3–68, Colby Pearson 4–51, Talon Shumway 2–36, Jonah Trinnaman 3–20, Aleva Hifo 2–12, Garrett Juergens 1–11, Moroni Laulu-Pututau 1–9, Hunter Marshall 1–9, Tanner Balderree 1–5.
Interceptions: SUU: Josh Thornton 1–0.

UMass

Sources:

Uniform combination: white helmet, blue jersey, white pants.

Game Stats: 
Passing: UMass: Andrew Ford 27–40–2—288; BYU: Taysom Hill 19–31–0—171, Tanner Mangum 2–4–0—19.
Rushing: UMass: Marquis Young 10–40, Andy Isabella 3–32, Team 1-(−1), John Robinson-Woodgett 1-(−2), Ford 5-(−29); BYU: KJ Hall 18–101, Hill 13–86, Harvey Langi 14–56, Aleva Hifo 1–6, Colby Hansen 1–2, Algernon Brown 1–2, Team 1-(−1).
Receiving: UMass: Adam Breneman 8–79, Bernard Davis 2–76, Isabella 6–57, Jalen Williams 6–50, Robinson 1–10; BYU: Moroni Laulu-Pututau 5–42, Colby Pearson 2–38, Mitch Juergens 4–30, Nick Kurtz 3–20, Tanner Balderree 2–18, Talon Shumway 1–13, Nate Sampson 1–12, Hall 2–10, Garrett Juergens 1–7.
Interceptions: BYU: Francis Bernard 1–39, Isai Armstrong 1–0.

Utah State

Sources:

Uniform combination: black helmet with royal blue decals and royal blue chromium facemasks, black jersey, black pants.

Game Stats: 
Passing: USU: Kent Meyers 12–23–1—103; BYU: Taysom Hill 10–21–2—101, Tanner Mangum 1–1–0—5.
Rushing: USU: Tonny Lindsey 8–47, Myers 12–42, Lajuan Hunt 5–12, Damion Hobbs 2–4, Team 1-(−8); BYU: Jamaal Williams 18–131, Hill 12–46, Squally Canada 10–40, Harvey Langi 6–23, KJ Hall 4–23, Team 1-(−2), Mangum 3-(−12).
Receiving: USU: Braelon Roberts 3–27, Wyatt Houston 2–22, Andrew Rodriguez 1–14, Rayshad Lewis 3–13, Ronquavion Tarver 1–12, Kennedy Williams 1–8, Zach Van Leeuwen 1–7; BYU: Nick Kurtz 4–50, Moroni Laulu-Pututau 1–15, Garrett Juergens 1–12, Colby Pearson 2–11, Mitch Juergens 1–10, Hunter Marshall 1–5, Tanner Balderree 1–3.
Interceptions: USU: Jalen Davis 1–37, Dallin Leavitt 1–7; BYU: Fred Warner 1–2.

Poinsettia Bowl

Sources:

Uniform combination: white helmet, white jersey, white pants.

Game Stats: 
Passing: BYU: Tanner Mangum 8–15–1—96; WYO: Josh Allen 17–32–2—207, Nick Szpor 0–1–0—0
Rushing: BYU: Jamaal Williams 26–210, Squally Canada 4–17, KJ Hall 1–1, Team 2-(−4), Tanner Mangum 2-(−8); WYO: Brian Hill 26–93, Shaun Wick 13–58, Josh Allen 6–38, Ethan Wood 1-(−20)
Receiving: BYU: Nick Kurtz 3–59, Colby Pearson 2–16, Moroni Laulu-Pututau 1–11, Tanner Balderree 1–5, Jonah Trinnaman 1–5; WYO: Tanner Gentry 7–113, Jake Maulhardt 2–33, Brian Hill 1–19, Jacob Hollister 2–15, Josh Harshman 1–9, C.J. Johnson 2–6, Shaun Wick 1–6, Austin Conway 1–6
Interceptions: BYU: Kai Nacua 1–20, Dayan Ghanwoloku 1–14; WYO: Andrew Wingard 1–20

References

BYU
BYU Cougars football seasons
Poinsettia Bowl champion seasons
BYU Cougars football